Mylai Chinna Thambi Pillai Rajah (17 June 1883 – 23 August 1943) was an Indian politician, educationist, social and political activist from the Indian state of Tamil Nadu.

Rajah was born to a Tamil family of Madras. He entered politics after graduation and was a leader in the Justice Party. However, he quit the party in 1923 over the party's treatment of the then Depressed Classes. He was the first leader who organized the Scheduled Classes at the national level in India, and the most prominent Scheduled Classes leader of pre-independent India. In his heyday, Rajah was considered to be a person equal in stature to B. R. Ambedkar. He was the pioneer of mid-day meal scheme in India.

Early life

Rajah was born to Mylai Chinna Thambi Pillai in 1883 at St. Thomas Mount, Madras. Chinna Thambi Pillai was the manager of Lawrence Asylum. Rajah had his schooling at the Wesley Mission High School, Royapettah and Wesley College. He graduated from Madras Christian College and worked as a school teacher and later a professor.

Politics

Rajah joined politics at an early age and was elected president of the Chingleput district board. In 1916, he became the Secretary of the Adi-Dravida Mahajana Sabha. He was one of the founder-members of the South Indian Liberal Federation. Rajah was elected to the Madras Legislative Council as a Justice Party candidate during the first general elections held in November 1920. He was elected Deputy Leader of the Justice Party in the house. Rajah was the first member of the scheduled caste community to be elected to the Madras Legislative Council. In 1922, Rajah passed a resolution demanding that the terms Paraiya and Panchama be dropped from official usage and instead be substituted with Adi-Dravida and Adi-Andhra.

In 1921, the Justice Party government of the Raja of Panagal introduced reservations for non-Brahmins in government jobs. However, this act did not allocate quotas for scheduled castes as demanded by Rajah. Disenchanted, Rajah led a delegation of scheduled castes to protest the act and press their demand for separate quota. But the Justice Party did not respond. Instead, when riots broke out in Puliyanthope the same year, top-ranking Justice Party leaders regarded the Government's policy of appeasement of paraiyars responsible for the strike. Outraged at this, Rajah quit the party in 1923. He remained a member of the Madras Legislative Council till 1926. In 1925, he created and became the president of the All India Depressed Classes Association at Nagpur. From 1927 till 1937, he was a member of the Imperial Legislative Assembly. During April–July 1937 he was the Madras Presidency's Minister for Development in the short lived interim provisional cabinet of Kurma Venkata Reddy Naidu.

In 1917, he was nominated by Lord Pentland to the Elementary Education Committee. In 1919, he served on the select committee of the Elementary Education Bill. He was also a member of the Secondary Education Reorganization Committee. In 1924, Lord Willingdon nominated him to the Senate of Madras University.

Change of views

Originally Rajah stood for the Separate Electorates and Ambedkar for the Joint Electorates with Adult Suffrage and Reservation of seats. But Ambedkar changed his state of mind to the separate electorate, putting forth separate electorates as a united demand of the then Depressed Classes due to the pressure from Rajah and Madras Presidency Organisations in 1931. However, Rajah changed his mind to Joint Electorates with reserved seats on population basis due to lower representation of the Minority Pact in 1932. So he concluded a pact with the All India President of the Hindu Mahasabha B. S. Moonje. This was known as the Rajah–Moonje pact. According to this pact, Moonje offered reserved seats to the Scheduled Castes in return for Rajah's support. The Rajah-Moonje Pact was a precursor for the Poona Pact.

Death

Rajah died on Monday, 23 August 1943 at his house at St. Thomas Mount, today named as "Rajah Street". To honour his works, Bayya Suryanarayana Murthy founded the M. C. Rajah Memorial Hostel for the college students of the Scheduled Classes in 1944 at Saidapet in Madras.

Publications

 
 
Jain Meeanakshi, Rajah-Moonje Pact: Documents On A Forgotten Chapter Of Indian History (with Devendra Svarupa, Low Price Publishers, 2007), .

See also

Rettamalai Srinivasan
B R Ambedkar

References

Bibliography

External links
Celebrating the Birth Anniversary of M. C. Rajah

1883 births
1943 deaths
Tamil Nadu politicians
Madras Christian College alumni
Members of the Central Legislative Assembly of India
Politicians from Chennai
Activists from Tamil Nadu